...on Television or ...on TV, is a long-running late night television programme on ITV. The programme, which was made first by LWT and then Granada Productions, featured a number of clips from unusual or (often unintentionally) amusing television programmes and commercials from around the world.

The show was first presented by TV critic and journalist Clive James between 1982 and 1988, before returning in 1997–98 and by celebrity chef Keith Floyd in 1989. Chris Tarrant took over as host initially from 1990 to 1996 and then again from 1998 until its demise in 2006. On Christmas Day 2020, the show was revived for a one-off special with Jeremy Clarkson as host. Another episode with Clarkson aired in April 2021, with a series of three being broadcast after Who Wants to Be a Millionaire? in July 2021.

Early years
The show first began in 1982, hosted by the Australian television critic and satirist Clive James. The series showed funny and bizarre clips from TV shows and adverts from around the world, most notably from the Far Eastern countries of Japan and Korea. The series popularised the Japanese show Endurance which followed numerous contestants as they underwent painful tasks around the world.

After James joined the BBC in 1988, celebrity chef Keith Floyd was brought in for a six-episode series in 1989 before Chris Tarrant took over in 1990.

Later years
For its tenth anniversary in 1992, Tarrant presented a compilation series entitled Tarrant's Ten Years of Television (later 10 Years on TV), which showed clips from the past five series and specials. It also included extra footage that was deemed unsuitable for transmission in the original show.

In 1997, Clive James returned as host for two series, produced by Watchmaker Productions for Carlton Television, in 1997 and 1998.

Tarrant on TV
The show continued to show bizarre clips from all over the world. But they now often included nudity, strong language, and crude or dark humour. Examples include a Japanese crying contest, a Japanese contraception advert, a profane North Korean propaganda film, and an advert showing eggs being fired from the bottom. Tarrant on TV also began to cover more violent and unusual programming such as the Jerry Springer Show or The Man Show.

With a different presenter, the format was also altered to include a special guest. On 4 April 1992, Mel Brooks appeared on the show. The show's content focused on different types of humour in Sweden, America and Israel. However the celebrity guest format was dropped by LWT because it was deemed too expensive to pay for cinematic clips and a guest star each week.

The last series of Tarrant on TV was in 2005, with a special broadcast in October 2006. The theme tune between 1996 and 2006 was Syd Dale's "The Penthouse Suite".

It's Clarkson on TV
On Christmas Day 2020, a revival of the show was broadcast, with Jeremy Clarkson hosting a review of the year's television. A second episode was broadcast on 2 April 2021 with a series following in July 2021. Now produced for ITV by Expectation Entertainment, the series has moved away from featuring as many foreign television clips (such as Japanese game show Endurance) as its predecessors, with British dramas such as White House Farm, Quiz and Des critiqued alongside English-language shows on streaming services, such as Love is Blind and Selling Sunset.

Transmissions
No full series was aired between 1985 and 1988, in 1991, 1992, 1994 and 1997; however special episodes were often broadcast.

Regular series

Revived series

Specials
Hosted by Clive James:
Special 1: 5 January 1986
Special 2: 29 March 1986
Special 3: 28 June 1986
Special 4: 28 December 1986
Special 5: 1 January 1987
Special 6: 19 April 1987
Special 7: 11 October 1987
Special 8: 1 January 1988

Hosted by Chris Tarrant:
Special 9: 30 December 1990
Special 10: 4 January 1992
Special 11: 4 April 1992
Special 12: 11 July 1992
Special 13: 26 September 1993
Special 14 (Tarrant's Ten Years of..): 17 September 1994
Special 15 (Tarrant's Ten Years of..): 24 September 1994
Special 16: 27 December 1997 (Christmas special)
Special 17: 10 May 1998 (Best of TV Series 9)
Special 18: 16 May 1999 (Best of Series 10)
Special 19: 7 May 2000 (Best of Series 11)
Special 20: 25 March 2001 (Tarrant on CCTV)
Special 21: 20 January 2002 (Tarrant on CCTV)
Special 22: 7 July 2002 (Tarrant on CCTV)
Special 23: 23 November 2002
Special 24: 14 December 2002
Special 25: 5 May 2003 (Tarrant on CCTV)
Special 26: 4 September 2003
Special 27: 23 October 2003
Special 28: 7 November 2003
Special 29: 24 December 2003
Special 30: 13 May 2004 (Japan special)
Special 31: 5 July 2004
Special 32: 31 August 2004
Special 33: 5 October 2006

Hosted by Jeremy Clarkson:
Special 34: 25 December 2020
Special 35: 2 April 2021

It's Clarkson on TV series

See also
 Japandemonium – an ITV show featuring clips of modern Japanese shows in the style of Endurance and with a voice-over from Melvin Odoom.
Paddy's TV Guide – a similar show made by ITV (with Paddy McGuinness) for Channel 4.
Channel Hopping With Jon Richardson – a weird TV clips show on Comedy Central presented by Jon Richardson.
Gogglebox - Channel 4

References

External links

Tarrant on TV at BFI
Clive James on TV at BFI
Tarrant on CCTV at BFI

1980s British comedy television series
1990s British comedy television series
2000s British comedy television series
2020s British comedy television series
1982 British television series debuts
ITV comedy
London Weekend Television shows
Television series by ITV Studios
Television advertising
English-language television shows
Television series about television